Joseph "Lefty" Bell was a baseball pitcher and outfielder in the Negro leagues. He played with the Montgomery Grey Sox in 1932.

While 1932 was Bell's first year in professional baseball, he was expected to be one of the league's best pitchers by the end of the season. However, he only appeared in two recorded games as a pitcher, going 1-0 with a 3.14 earned run average in 14.1 innings pitched. He also played the outfield, recording four hits in 14 at bats.

References

External links
  and Seamheads

Montgomery Grey Sox players
Year of birth missing
Year of death missing
Baseball pitchers